The subfamily Larentiinae of the moth family Geometridae contains the following genera:

Tribe Asthenini

Tribe Cataclysmiini

Tribe Chesiadini

Tribe Cidariini

Tribe Eudulini

Tribe Eupitheciini

Tribe Hydriomenini

Tribe Larentiini

Tribe Melanthiini

Tribe Operophterini

Tribe Perizomini

Tribe Phileremini

Tribe Rheumapterini

Tribe Solitaneini

Tribe Stamnodini

Tribe Trichopterygini

Tribe Xanthorhoini

Incertae sedis

Not sorted yet

References 

 List of genera
Larentiinae, genera